Rentschler is a surname. Notable people with the surname include:

Carrie Rentschler, academician in Feminist studies, scholar, writer, associate professor at McGill University, Montreal, Quebec, Canada
Frederick Rentschler (1887–1956), American aircraft engine designer, aviation engineer, and industrialist
Gordon S. Rentschler (1885–1948), American businessman, a chairman of First National City Bank, a predecessor of Citigroup
Harvey C. Rentschler (1880–1949), American physicist, inventor, and research direct at Westinghouse Lamp Plant
Thomas Rentschler (1932–2016), American politician, member of the Ohio House of Representatives

See also
Garver-Rentschler Barn, a registered historic building in Hamilton, Ohio, United States
Rentschler Farm Museum, a historic site near downtown Saline, Michigan
Rentschler Field, an airport in East Hartford, Connecticut in use from 1933 to 1999
Rentschler Heliport, a private heliport for the exclusive use of United Technologies Corporation, located southeast of East Hartford, Connecticut
Rentschler House, a historic residence in the city of Hamilton, Ohio, United States
Hooven-Owens-Rentschler, American manufacturer of steam and diesel engines in Hamilton, Ohio, also known as H.O.R.
Pratt & Whitney Stadium at Rentschler Field, a sports stadium in East Hartford, Connecticut